Amelia Magdalena Hundley (born January 21, 1998) is a former American artistic gymnast. She won a gold, silver, and bronze medal at the 2015 Pan-American Games in Toronto, Ontario, Canada. She also won team gold medals competing for the United States at the 2012 Pacific Rim Gymnastics Championships and the City of Jesolo Trophy.

Hundley ended her elite gymnastics career at the 2016 Olympic gymnastics Trials in San Jose, California. She now attends the University of Florida on a full athletic scholarship and will compete for the Florida Gators gymnastics team in the NCAA.

Hundley trained at the Cincinnati Gymnastics Academy under coaches Mary Lee Tracy and Amy Wert, and fitness trainer Betsy McNally, before joining the Florida Gators gymnastics team in the Fall of 2016.

Early life
Born January 21, 1998, in Hamilton, Ohio, Hundley started tumbling at the age of four in the dance studio run by her mother, a professional tumbler. She proceeded into gymnastics and by age seven was competing in the level-5 (the second level of USAG competition) 2005 Gatlin Classic. In 2006, she won the all-around, balance beam and floor exercise titles at the Fiesta Bowl Invitational. By 2007, Hundley had advanced to compete as a level-7 gymnast, and in 2008 advanced again to compete as a level-10 gymnast.

Junior career
Hundley, as a  junior international elite gymnast from Cincinnati Gymnastics Academy (CGA) in Ohio, participated in the gold medal-winning United States team at the 2012 Pacific Rim Gymnastics Championships. In June 2012 she competed in the VISA Championships, also known as the USA Gymnastics National Championships, improving her AA score from 56.750 to 57.250. In March 2013, Hundley participated with the United States national squad in its group performance in the City of Jesolo Trophy, in Jesolo, Italy.

Senior career
Hundley's senior debut came at the Secret U.S. Classic in August 2014, where she placed 6th AA, advancing to Nationals.

At the 2014 P&G Gymnastics Championships, Hundley placed sixth in the all-around, seventh on the balance beam and floor, and eighth on the uneven bars. She was named to the national team and the Pan American Championships team. At the Pan American Championships, she won a gold medal in the team competition.

At the Pan-American Games in Toronto (July 11–15, 2015), she was part of the US team that won gold convincingly.  She also won silver on the floor exercise, with a score of 14.200.  On the uneven bars, she was the lead-off competitor with a score of 14.650, winning bronze.  Her teammate Rachel Gowey won gold with a score of 14.725. Hundley also placed fourth in the all-around at the Pan-Am Games.

Hundley competed on the first night of the P&G National Gymnastics Championships. She slightly tore her meniscus on her first tumbling pass on floor, her first event. She continued the first night of competition. At the end of night one, she was in 9th place. She withdrew for night two due to the injury she sustained on floor exercise. Despite her injury, she was named to the Senior National Team and is invited to the 2015 Worlds Selection Camp in September.

On November 11, 2015, she signed the National Letter of Intent to the University of Florida. On February 29, 2016, USA Gymnastics revealed that Hundley would represent the United States at the 2016 Stuttgart World Cup on March 19.

In March 2016, it was announced that Hundley would replace the injured Nia Dennis at the 2016 Stuttgart World Cup in Stuttgart, Germany. This event concluded the C III FIG World Cup Series and competitors were vying for the All-Around title. Hundley had strong performances on every event except uneven bars, where she faltered slightly, scoring a 13.266. However, due to her three other strong events, Hundley placed 3rd All-Around, winning the bronze medal with a score of 56.499.

References

External links
 
 

1998 births
Living people
Sportspeople from Cincinnati
American female artistic gymnasts
Gymnasts at the 2015 Pan American Games
Cincinnati Gymnastics Academy
Pan American Games gold medalists for the United States
Pan American Games silver medalists for the United States
Pan American Games bronze medalists for the United States
Pan American Games medalists in gymnastics
Florida Gators women's gymnasts
U.S. women's national team gymnasts
Medalists at the 2015 Pan American Games
21st-century American women